Ľudovít Cvetler (born 17 September 1938 in Bernolákovo) is a former Slovak football player. He played for Czechoslovakia. He played mostly for ŠK Slovan Bratislava. He helped them to the 1969 European Cup Winners' Cup Final where he scored one of their goals as they beat Barcelona 3–2.

External links
 Profile at Czech football federation
 Profile at Standard de Liège

1938 births
Living people
Slovak footballers
Czechoslovak footballers
Czechoslovakia international footballers
Olympic footballers of Czechoslovakia
Olympic silver medalists for Czechoslovakia
Olympic medalists in football
Footballers at the 1964 Summer Olympics
Medalists at the 1964 Summer Olympics
People from Senec District
Sportspeople from the Bratislava Region
ŠK Slovan Bratislava players
Standard Liège players
FC Zbrojovka Brno players
Association football forwards